This is a complete list of high schools in the U.S. state of Delaware.

Public schools

New Castle County

Kent County

Sussex County

Private schools

New Castle County

Kent County

Sussex County

See also
List of school districts in Delaware

Delaware
High